The name Eureka Valley refers to two distinct places in the U.S. state of California:

Eureka Valley, San Francisco, a neighborhood
Eureka Valley (Inyo County), a valley